Willy Spuhler (born 9 October 1941) is a Swiss racing cyclist. He rode in the 1967 Tour de France.

References

1941 births
Living people
Swiss male cyclists
Place of birth missing (living people)